Iru Uma (Aymara iru spiny Peruvian feather grass, uma water, 'feather grass water', Hispanicized spelling Irohuma, Irouma) is a   mountain in the Andes of southern Peru. It is situated in the Moquegua Region, Mariscal Nieto Province, Carumas District, and in the Tacna Region, Candarave Province, Candarave District. Iru Uma lies southeast of Wisk'acha Lake and southwest of the mountain Wisk'acha.

References

Mountains of Moquegua Region
Mountains of Tacna Region
Mountains of Peru